William John Brockway (8 October 1928 – 26 July 2009) was a male Welsh competitive swimmer.

Swimming career
Brockway represented Great Britain at the Olympics and European championships, and Wales at the British Empire Games, during the late 1940s and 1950s.  Brockway was a backstroke specialist who served as the captain of the British swimming team at the 1952 and 1956 Olympics.

He was born in Bristol, England, and died in Newport, Wales.

Brockway made his Olympic debut at the 1948 Olympic Games in London, where he advanced to the final of the men's 100-metre backstroke, finishing seventh in a time of 1:09.2.  He swam the same event at the 1952 Olympic Games in Helsinki, and 1956 Olympic Games in Melbourne, but was unable to progress to the event final despite swimming faster times on each occasion.

Competing for Wales at the 1950 British Empire Games in Auckland, New Zealand, he won the silver medal in the men's 110-yard backstroke in 1:08.0. He then went on to win the gold medal in the same event at the 1954 British Empire and Commonwealth Games in Vancouver, Canada, swimming a time of 1:06.5.  In the 1958 British Empire and Commonwealth Games in Cardiff, Wales, he finished sixth in the 110-yard backstroke, and sixth as a member of the Welsh men's team in the 4×110-yard medley relay.

At the ASA National British Championships he won the 110 yards backstroke title seven times (1948, 1949, 1950, 1951, 1953, 1954, 1955).

Personal life
Following his swimming career, Brockway became an engineer at steelworks in the Newport area of South Wales.

See also
 List of Commonwealth Games medallists in swimming (men)

References

External links
British Olympic Association athlete profile

1928 births
2009 deaths
Commonwealth Games gold medallists for Wales
Commonwealth Games silver medallists for Wales
European Aquatics Championships medalists in swimming
Male backstroke swimmers
Olympic swimmers of Great Britain
Sportspeople from Bristol
Sportspeople from Newport, Wales
Swimmers at the 1948 Summer Olympics
Swimmers at the 1950 British Empire Games
Swimmers at the 1952 Summer Olympics
Swimmers at the 1954 British Empire and Commonwealth Games
Swimmers at the 1956 Summer Olympics
Swimmers at the 1958 British Empire and Commonwealth Games
Welsh male swimmers
Commonwealth Games medallists in swimming
Medallists at the 1950 British Empire Games
Medallists at the 1954 British Empire and Commonwealth Games